The Corwin House is a historic home located in Lebanon, Ohio, that was once inhabited by former Ohio Governor and United States Treasury Secretary Thomas Corwin.  It is a 16-room frame house built in 1818 by Phineas Ross.

References

External links

Federal architecture in Ohio
Houses completed in 1818
Houses in Warren County, Ohio